Sir Herbert Frederick Cook, 3rd Baronet (18 November 1868 – 4 May 1939) was an English art patron and art historian.

Life
Only son of Sir Frederick Cook, he was educated at Harrow School and Balliol College, Oxford. He was subsequently called to the Bar by the Inner Temple in 1895. He married in 1898 to the Honourable Mary Hood, daughter of the 2nd Viscount Bridport, with whom he had one son (Francis, who succeeded him) and two daughters.

In 1920, he succeeded to his father's baronetcy, along with the first baronet's art collection, which he catalogued in three volumes in 1913 and which thereafter became known in art history publications as the "Cook Collection, Doughty House, Richmond". Though he was not a major collector himself, he did add Rembrandt’s Portrait of a boy (Norton Simon Foundation) and Titian’s Portrait of a lady (National Gallery, London).

Cook Collection

He was an art historian who wrote a catalog raisonné of Giorgione works in 1900, and managed and hosted visits to his family's collection which included a Cima da Conegliano Madonna and Child and two Giorgiones at Doughty House. He was a co-founder of The Art Fund, and in 1903 was founding member of the "Consultative Committee" of the Burlington Magazine. Other members were Lord Dillon and Lord Balcarres, Sir Martin Conway, Sidney Colvin, Campbell Dodgson, Herbert Horne, Charles Eliot Norton, Claude Phillips, and Roger Fry. Later Roger Fry disagreed with some of Cook's optimistic Giorgione attributions, especially Cook's 1913 acquisition of 'La Schiavona', which he catalogued as The portrait of Caterina Cornaro by Giorgione (finished by Titian). The other Giorgione in his collection that was purchased in 1907, has since been reattributed to Giovanni Cariani.

He was a member of the Arundel Club and served on committees for foreign exhibitions and organised several in London. In 1930, he also gave £1000 to the University of London for the Courtauld Institute of Art.

Selected works
Giorgione - 1900
 Volume II, Dutch & Flemish schools, A catalogue of the paintings at Doughty House, Richmond, & elsewhere in the collection of Sir Frederick Cook, bt., Visconde de Monserrate, by Cook, Herbert; Borenius, Tancred, 1885-1948; Kronig, J. O., 1887-1984; Brockwell, Maurice W., 1869-1958, on archive.org

References

External links
 
 
 Obituary, The Times, 5 May 1939
 http://thepeerage.com/p8092.htm#i80912
 

1868 births
1939 deaths
English philanthropists
Alumni of Balliol College, Oxford
People educated at Harrow School
English art historians
Baronets in the Baronetage of the United Kingdom